Yeltsin. Three Days in August is a political drama directed by Alexander Mokhov of the Moscow events of August 1991.

Plot
The film is based on the August 1991 attempted coup d'état in the Soviet Union. Preparations are under way for the signing of the Union Treaty. It becomes a question of changing the ruling elite in the country. The conspirators are blocking Mikhail Gorbachev at his dacha in Foros, after which they announce the formation of the State Committee on the State of Emergency.  Vice President Gennady Yanayev is announced as Acting President of the Soviet Union.

Boris Yeltsin goes to the parliament building (the Russian White House), where he heads the opposition. A tough confrontation between Boris Yeltsin and the State Emergency Committee and his supporters begins ...

Cast
The cast were as follows:
Dmitry Nazarov as Boris Yeltsin
 Alexander Sirin as Vladimir Kryuchkov
 Vladimir Steklov as Pavel Grachev
 Felix Antipov as Dmitry Yazov
 Vladimir Yumatov as  Mikhail Gorbachev
 Svetlana Antonova as Tatyana Dyachenko
  Sherkhan Abilov as Nursultan Nazarbayev
 Yelena Valyushkina as Naina Yeltsina
 Igor Staroselytsev as Alexander Rutskoy
 Alexander Klyukvin as Valentin Pavlov
 Pavel Danilov as Boris Pugo
 Elena Lyamina as Elena Okulova
 Alexander Shavrin as Gennady Yanayev
 Valentina Sharykina as Emma Yazova

Criticism
 Тhree days and 20 years

References

External links
 
 Five must-watch films about Russian politics 
 На НТВ премьера художественного фильма, основанного на реальных событиях

2011 television films
2011 films
Russian television films
Russian drama films
2010s Russian-language films
2010s political drama films
Films based on actual events
Cultural depictions of Mikhail Gorbachev
Cultural depictions of Boris Yeltsin
Films set in 1991
Films set in Russia
Films about coups d'état